John Pugh Pryse (1739–1774) was the member of Parliament for the constituency of Cardiganshire in 1761–1768 and Merioneth in the parliament of 1768–1774.

References 

Members of Parliament for Merioneth
Members of Parliament for Cardiganshire
1739 births
1774 deaths